Hipparagi  is a village in the southern state of Karnataka, India. It is located in the "'Rabakavi Banahatti"' taluk of Bagalkot district in Karnataka.
Sangameshwar temple is most popular in Hipparagi and also famous for Krishna river, Hipparagi Barrage. ಹಿಪ್ಪರಗಿ ಗ್ರಾಮ ಲೆಕ್ಕಾಧಿಕಾರಿಗಳು ಕಾರ್ಯಾಲಯ

Demographics
 India census, Hipparagi had a population of 6913 with 3560 males and 3353 females.

See also
 Bagalkot
 Districts of Karnataka

References

External links
 http://Bagalkot.nic.in/

Villages in Bagalkot district